The Penalty Law of the People's Republic of China, as amended in 1997, provides for a penalty of death, or imprisonment for life or no less than 10 years, for "killing with intent." However, the penalty for "minor killing with intent" is imprisonment for no less than 3 years. In practice, "killing with indignation" (killing someone who is obviously very harmful to the society) and killings committed in excessive defense are considered "minor."

See also
List of murder laws by country

References

China, People's Republic of
 
Chinese law